Audun is a Norwegian masculine given name. Notable people with the name include:

Audun Boysen (1929–2000), Norwegian middle distance runner
Audun Endestad (born 1953), Norwegian-born American cross country skier, author and field guide
Audun Grønvold (born 1976), Norwegian freestyle skier
Audun Heimdal (1997–2022), Norwegian orienteer
Audun Hetland (1920–1998), Norwegian illustrator
Audun Hugleiksson (1240–1302), Norwegian nobleman at the end of the 13th century
Audun Kleive (born 1961), Norwegian drummer and percussionist
Audun Laading (1993–2019), Norwegian bassist and backing vocalist of the indie rock duo Her's
Audun Lysbakken (born 1977), Norwegian politician for the Socialist Left Party
Audun Munthe-Kaas Hierman (1892–1975), Norwegian newspaper editor and novelist
Audun Østerås (born 1947), Norwegian civil servant and politician for the Centre Party
Audun Tron (born 1945), Norwegian politician for the Labour Party
Audun Weltzien (born 1983), Norwegian orienteering competitor

See also
Audun-le-Roman, location within Lorraine region, France
Audun-le-Tiche, location within Lorraine region, France

Norwegian masculine given names